Gábor Bojár (born 27 March 1949) is a Hungarian entrepreneur and founder of Graphisoft, an AEC (architecture, engineering, and construction) CAD company. Graphisoft was acquired by German Nemetschek AG in 2007.

In 1973 he received a degree in physics from Eötvös Loránd University. Bojár started his professional career at the state geophysics institute in the late 1970s. In 1980, when the institute stopped funding his modelling software, he left and began to work as a programmer abroad, together with his student colleague Ulrich Zimmer.

Graphisoft
Between 1982 and 2007, Bojár served as founder and president-CEO of Graphisoft. The company was launched in 1982, when Bojár and Zimmer developed software, assisting the Hungarian ministry of power in solving a major problem with the installation of a soviet nuclear power plant. They used the geophysics institute's computers at night, solved the problem and were awarded $30,000 for their software's 300 engineering maps and drawings.

Subsequently, the company re-wrote their software for Apple Lisa, which didn't succeed economically, but kept the company alive throughout the 1980s. Bojár had to smuggle four Macintosh's into Hungary and was supported with cash by Steve Jobs, whom Bojár had first met in 1984.

During the 1990s, Graphisoft continued to expanded internationally and was eventually acquired by the sectors leading German company Nemetschek AG, in 2007.

Under Bojár's leadership, Graphisoft developed from a small two-person venture into the worldwide market leader in the field of 3D building modeling software, with more than 300 employees and the firm's earnings growing from $30.000 in 1982 to an estimated $33 million in 2018.

In 2002, Bojár named Ray Small as new CEO, remaining active as chairman of the company, in charge of Graphisoft's overall strategy.

Graphisoft Park
Graphisoft Park SE is a real-estate enterprise, founded by Bojár.

Aquincum Institute of Technology
Following the sale of Graphisoft in 2007, Bojár founded the Aquincum Institute of Technology (AIT), a school for information technology and entrepreneurship, in the same year. The school's curriculum offers design, entrepreneurship, and foundational courses in computer science. The subjects are combined with advanced applications in computational biology and computer vision for digital film post-production as well as humanities courses related to Hungary's cultural heritage.

Additional memberships
Bojár serves on the board of Masterplast Group.

Awards and recognitions
Bojár has received different national and international awards and prizes.
He was named Entrepreneur of the Year by Ernst & Young in 2007 and in 2014, he received the Iván Völgyes Award of AmCham Hungary.

Bojár was awarded the Order of Merit of the Republic of Hungary.

External links
 Bojár's CV.
 High hopes for hi-tech, BBC News.

References

Living people
Hungarian computer scientists
1949 births